Atmeydanı incident was an uprising which occurred at the Hippodrome of Constantinople in Istanbul, the capital of the  Ottoman Empire, in 1648.

Background 
Sultan İbrahim (reigned 1640–1648) of the Ottoman Empire was dethroned on 12 August 1648. Several days later he was killed. His 6-year-old son Mehmet IV (reigned 1648–1687) ascended the throne. It was a custom in the Ottoman Empire that the new sultan tip the soldiers when he ascended the throne. However, due to the costly Cretan War ongoing, the regents of the sultan were unable to pay the required tip. The sipahi corps, the main cavalry units of the Ottoman Army, were especially complainant, for they were not paid soldiers.

The incident 
Two months later, the Ottoman Porte, the government, decided to send sipahi units to Crete. The angry sipahis returned to İstanbul to demand their tips along with some other rights. Some İstanbul residents also joined them. They gathered in the square named Atmeydanı, the Hippodrome from the Byzantine times, situated in front of the Topkapı Palace. According to the Romanian historian Nicolae Iorga (1871–1940), Valide sultan Kösem Sultan, the mother of Sultan İbrahim, secretly supported the mob. The demands became more extreme, including demands for the execution of some statesmen, although the government met most of them in the beginning. One of the negotiators sent to the scene, actually a member of the janissary corps, was killed by the mob. Then, the janissaries loyal to the palace were charged over the sipahis. After bloody clashes, the better organized janissaries defeated the sipahis.

Aftermath 
The sipahis were subdued. However, the janissaries gained too much power and soon began to create unrest in İstanbul. The troubled years of the Empire lasted until the beginning of Köprülü era in 1656.

References 

17th century in Istanbul
Rebellions against the Ottoman Empire
Conflicts in 1648
17th-century rebellions
Military history of Istanbul
1648 in the Ottoman Empire